

Belgium
 Congo Free State
 Théophile Wahis, Governor-General of the Congo Free State (1892–1908)
 Émile Wangermée, acting Governor-General of the Congo Free State (1896–1900)

France
 Côte d'Ivoire –
Louis Mouttet, Governor-General of Côte d'Ivoire
Adrien Jules Jean Bonhoure, Governor-General of Côte d'Ivoire (1898)
Jean Penel, Acting Governor-General of Côte d'Ivoire
 French Indochina – Paul Doumer, Governor-General of French Indochina (1897–1902)
 French Somaliland –
 Léonce Lagarde, Governor of French Somaliland (1888–1899)
 Louis Mizon, acting Governor of French Somaliland (1899)
 Alfred Albert Martineau, Governor of French Somaliland (1899–1900)
 Guinea – Paul Jean François Cousturier, Lieutenant-Governor of Guinea (1898–1900)

Japan
 Taiwan – Kodama Gentarō, Governor-General of Taiwan (26 February 1898 – April 1906)

Germany
 Kamerun – Puttkamer, Jesko von, 1895–1907
 Deutsch-Südwestafrika – Theodor Leutwein

Portugal
 Angola – António Duarte Ramada Curto, Governor-General of Angola (1897–1900)

United Kingdom
 Jamaica – Augustus William Lawson Hemming, Governor of Jamaica (1898–1904)
 Malta Colony
Arthur Fremantle, Governor of Malta (1893–1899)
Francis Wallace Grenfell, Governor of Malta (1899–1903)
 Colony of Natal – Sir Walter Hely-Hutchinson (1893–1901)
 New South Wales
Viscount Hampden, Governor of New South Wales (1895–1899)
William Lygon, Lord Beauchamp, Governor of New South Wales (1899–31 December 1900 then State Governor on Australia's Federation to 1901)
 North-Eastern Rhodesia – Robert Edward Codrington, Administrator of North-Eastern Rhodesia (1898–1907)
 North-Western Rhodesia – Robert Thorne Coryndon, Administrator of North-Western Rhodesia (1897–1907)
 Queensland – Charles Cochrane-Baillie, Governor of Queensland (1896–31 December 1900 then State Governor on Australia's Federation to 1901)
 Tasmania – Jenico Preston, Lord Gormanston, Governor of Tasmania (1893–1900)
 South Australia
 Sir Thomas Buxton, Governor of South Australia (1895–1899)
 Lord Hallam Tennyson, Governor of South Australia (1899–31 December 1900 then State Governor on Australia's Federation to 1902)
 Victoria – Thomas, Earl Brassey, Governor of Victoria (1895–1900)
 Western Australia – Lieutenant-Colonel Gerard Smith, Governor of Western Australia (1895–1900)

Colonial governors
Colonial governors
1899